Maureen Larrazabal (born September 23, 1979) is a Filipino actress, singer and commercial model who is one of the popular and regular mainstays of the TV sitcom Bubble Gang of GMA Network. Before venturing into movie and television, Larrazabal was with the Big Deal band who often performs abroad. She was with the band for 10 years.

Personal life
Larrazabal is the daughter of Nestor Vera Cruz and Ana Marie Larrazabal. Mau, as she is fondly called, has two siblings: EJ Leonardo and Raine (Lorraine Ana). She got an AB Communication Arts in Interior Design from St. Paul University Quezon City.

During the COVID-19 pandemic, Larrazabal experienced the symptoms of COVID-19 in the last week of July 2020. She underwent self-quarantine for three weeks and her symptoms subsided. However, she tested positive on a swab test on August 25. On September 19, she announced that she tested negative for the virus.

Career
Before venturing into movies, Larrazabal made TV commercial appearances for Condura Refrigerators, Skin Reborn and Gilbeys Gin.

Beautiful Larrazabal started her film career via sexy-flicked movies such as Ekis (1999), Unfaithful Wife 2 (1999), Bulaklak ng Maynila (1999), Sugo ng Tondo (2000) and Blood Surf (2000). Showing her versatility, Larrazabal decided to shy away from doing sexy movies instead shifted to more wholesome projects. She began accepting TV projects. Her first break was playing the weather girl, Carrie in GMA 7's comedy sitcom, Mikee Forever. This was followed by more comedy sitcoms such as Iskul Bukolp and Gags Must Be Crazy of Viva TV, Home Along Da Riles of ABS-CBN, and finally , Bubble Gang.

Like some other actresses, both foreign and local, Larrazabal openly admitted that she had breast augmentation. 
As a result, Larrazabal has graced the covers of some of the Philippines' most popular men's magazines such as FHM Philippines and Maxim Philippines. In 2010, she was voted as FHM Top 25 Sexiest Women of the Decade in Philippines.

Filmography

Television

Films

References

Living people
Filipino film actresses
Filipino television actresses
Filipino women comedians
People from Manila
Actresses from Cebu
Singers from Cebu City
Filipino people of Basque descent
Filipino people of Spanish descent
1979 births
21st-century Filipino singers
GMA Network personalities